Wang Hao (born 15 December 1983) is a retired Chinese table tennis player. He became the world champion in men's singles in Yokohama, Japan, in May 2009, defeating three-time World Champion Wang Liqin 4–0. His other notable accomplishments include being a three-time World Cup Champion in 2007, 2008 and 2010, a singles silver medalist at the 2004 Summer Olympics, 2008 Summer Olympics and the 2012 Summer Olympics. In January 2010, he was replaced by Ma Long as the #1 rank on the official ITTF world rankings. He was previously ranked #1 on the official ITTF world rankings for 27 consecutive months, from October 2007 to December 2009. In April 2011, he was again the top ranked male player in the world. He is known to execute the Reverse Penhold Backhand (RPB) with exceptional skill.

During his career, he has appeared twelve times in major world competition finals, which is a record. In men's singles, he has won the Asian Championship, Asian Cup, Asian Games, and Chinese National Games at least once.

Wang Hao retired from the national team at the end of 2014.

Equipment
Wang Hao used a DHS Hurricane Hao blade(Special Blade for Wanghao : It's called N656) with a DHS Neo Skyline III Blue Sponge for forehand and Butterfly Sriver topsheet on Bryce sponge for his backhand.

Playing style
Wang uses a penhold grip. He is representative of a new wave of penhold players, having good attacking and defensive skills off both wings of the table. The greater freedom of the wrist involved in a penhold grip allows Wang Hao to generate large amounts of spin on the forehand side. 

Compared to most pen-hold players on the professional circuit, Wang Hao uses the reverse-side for almost all shots on the backhand side, with the small exception of balls placed very slow and short within the table during serves. This style of using the reverse-side exclusively for the backhand was considered to be improper, and when he first joined the national team most players did not think highly of him.

Personal life
Wang Hao and Yan Boya met in 2010 and they married in 2013. The same year, they had a son, Wang Ruiting. Wang Hao stated he would prefer his son to not pursue table tennis.

Achievements

 1996: joined Jilin Provincial Table Tennis Team
 1998: joined National Team and turned pro
 1999 World Club Championships:  Champion, team
 1999 Asian Junior Table Tennis Championships:  Champion, team;  runner-up, men's singles and men's doubles
 2000 World Club Championship:  Runner-up, men's team
 2001 Ninth National Games:  Champion, men's team
 2002 ITTF Pro Tour, Netherlands:  Champion, men's singles;  third, men's doubles
 2002 ITTF Pro Tour, Egypt:  Champion, men's singles;  third, men's doubles
 2003 47th World Table Tennis Championships:  Runner-up, men's doubles :  third, mixed doubles
 2003 ITTF Pro Tour, Croatia:  Champion, men's singles
 2003 ITTF Pro Tour, China:  Runner-up, men's singles and men's doubles
 2003 ITTF Pro Tour, Denmark:  Champion, men's doubles
 2003 ITTF Pro Tour, Sweden:  Champion, men's doubles
 2003 Asian Table Tennis Championships:  Champion, men's team and men's singles;  third, men's doubles
 2004 47th World Team Table Tennis Championships:  Champion, men's team
 2004 Olympics:  Silver medal, men's singles
 2004 World Cup:  Third, men's singles
 2004 ITTF Pro Tour, Greece:  Champion, men's singles;  runner-up, men's doubles
 2004 ITTF Pro Tour, South Korea:  Champion, men's doubles;  runner-up, men's singles
 2004 ITTF Pro Tour, Changchun:  Champion, men's doubles;  runner-up, men's singles
 2005 48th World Table Tennis Championships:  Champion, men's doubles
 2005 Asia Cup:  Champion, men's singles
 2005 Asian Table Tennis Championships: Champion, men's team
 2005 Qatar Open:  Champion, men's doubles
 2005 China Open:  Runner-up, men's doubles (Harbin);  Runner-up, men's singles (Shenzhen)
 2005 World Cup:  Runner-up, men's singles
 2006 48th World Team Table Tennis Championships:  Champion, men's team
 2006 World Cup:  Runner-up, men's singles
 2006 ITTF Pro Tour, Slovenia:  Champion, men's singles
 2006 ITTF Pro Tour, Croatia:  Champion, men's doubles
 2006 ITTF Pro Tour, Qatar:  Champion, men's doubles
 2006 ITTF Pro Tour, Japan:  Champion, men's doubles;  runner-up, men's singles
 2006 Asian Games:  Champion, men's singles and team
 2007 World Table Tennis Championships:  Runner-up, men's doubles;  third, men's singles
 2007 World Cup:  Champion, men's team and men's singles
 2007 ITTF Pro Tour, Slovenia:  Champion, men's singles
 2007 ITTF Pro Tour, Croatia:  Champion, men's doubles
 2007 ITTF Pro Tour, Shenzhen:  Champion, men's singles and men's doubles
 2007 ITTF Pro Tour, Nanjing:  Champion, men's doubles;  runner-up, men's singles
 2007 ITTF Pro Tour, Japan:  Champion, men's singles;  runner-up, men's doubles
 2007 Asian Table Tennis Championships:  Champion, men's team and men's singles;  runner-up, men's doubles
 2008 Olympics:  Champion, men's team
 2008 Olympics:  Silver medal, men's singles
 2008 World Team Table Tennis Championships:  Champion, men's team
 2008 World Cup:  Champion, men's singles
 2009 World Table Tennis Championships:  Champion, men's singles and men's double with Chen Qi
 2009 Eleventh National Games:  Champion, men's singles and mixed doubles and men's team
 2010 World Team Table Tennis Championships:  Champion, men's team
 2010 World Cup:  Champion, men's singles
 2010 Asian Games:  Silver Medal, men's singles
 2011 World Table Tennis Championships:  Runner-up, men's singles;   third, men's doubles
 2011 World Cup:  Runner-up, men's singles
 2012 Olympics:  Silver medal, men's singles
 2012 Olympics:  Champion, men's Team.
 2013 World Table Tennis Championships:  Runner-up, men's singles

See also
 World Table Tennis Championships

References

External links
 Table Tennis Master Career profile
 
 
 
 ITTF profile
 ITTF: World Ranking record
 Current ITTF: World Ranking
 
 
 

1983 births
Living people
Chinese male table tennis players
Olympic gold medalists for China
Olympic silver medalists for China
Olympic table tennis players of China
Sportspeople from Changchun
Table tennis players at the 2004 Summer Olympics
Table tennis players at the 2008 Summer Olympics
Table tennis players at the 2012 Summer Olympics
Olympic medalists in table tennis
Asian Games medalists in table tennis
Table tennis players from Jilin
Medalists at the 2012 Summer Olympics
Medalists at the 2008 Summer Olympics
Medalists at the 2004 Summer Olympics
Table tennis players at the 2006 Asian Games
Table tennis players at the 2010 Asian Games
Medalists at the 2006 Asian Games
Medalists at the 2010 Asian Games
Asian Games gold medalists for China
Asian Games silver medalists for China
Asian Games bronze medalists for China
World Table Tennis Championships medalists